Conkling Park is a census-designated place in Kootenai County, Idaho, United States.  Its population was 43 as of the 2010 census.

Demographics

References

Census-designated places in Kootenai County, Idaho
Census-designated places in Idaho